The riddles of Dunash ben Labrat (920×925-after 985) are noted as some of the first recorded Hebrew riddles, and part of Dunash's seminal development of Arabic-inspired Andalusian Hebrew poetry. Unlike some later Andalusian Hebrew riddle-writers, Dunash focused his riddles on everyday objects in the material world. His writing draws inspiration from the large corpus of roughly contemporary, poetic Arabic riddles. The riddles are in the wāfir metre.

Manuscripts

Riddles plausibly attributed to Dunash are known to survive in three manuscripts:
 One in Saint Petersburg [presumably in the collections of Abraham Firkovitch in the National Library of Russia]
 New York, Jewish Theological Seminary, Adler, 3702, which includes at least two riddles attributed to Dunash in the Philadelphia fragment.
 A Geniza fragment from between the tenth and twelfth century CE in Philadelphia, University of Pennsylvania, Center for Advanced Judaic Studies Library, Cairo Genizah Collection, Halper 317, f. 2v.

Each manuscript contains some material that overlaps with the others and some unique material. Between them, they contain a total of sixteen riddles that Nehemya Aluny thought could be attributed to Dunash.

Text

The ten riddles that appear in the Philadelphia fragment are characterised by Allony as a single 'poem of twenty lines in the wâfir metre, containing ten riddles', explicitly attributed to Dunash. Carlos del Valle Rodríguez later identified the metre as the similar hajaz.

This poem runs as follows:

Misattributions
Some of the riddles which in their earliest witness are attributed to Dunash are found in later manuscripts and editions attributed to other poets. The 1928-29 edition of the works of Solomon ben Gabirol by Hayim Nahman Bialik and Yehoshua Hana Rawnitzki include seven riddles, some of which appear in the Genizah fragment as Dunash's: Genizah riddle 6 appears as Ben Gabirol riddle 1; 7 appears as Ben Gabirol riddle 3; 8 appears as Ben Gabirol riddle 4; 9 appears as Ben Gabirol riddle 5; 10 appears as Ben Gabirol riddle 2.

References

Riddles
Hebrew-language literature